The Epirus water frog (Pelophylax epeiroticus) is a species of frog in the family Ranidae. It is found in western Greece, including Kerkyra, and the southern areas of Albania. The species is collected from the wild for human consumption.

Description
Like most frogs, Epirus water frogs show sexual dimorphism. The dorsal side is typically green with irregular black spots. The underside is pale. Male vocal sacs are olive aside from mating season, when they can turn a dark gray.

Distribution and habitat
The species occurs in Mediterranean-type shrubby vegetation, rivers, swamps, freshwater lakes and marshes, and plantations. It is threatened by habitat loss, and is classified as vulnerable as populations within its relatively small range are fragmented.

Reproductive behavior
The spawning period extends from the end of April to the beginning of May and can change by a few days depending on the latitude and altitude of a population and the local weather. In the case of high reproductive activity, calling begins in the morning at around 9 a.m. and lasts until midnight or longer with a longer break at dusk, during which the frogs are catching insects. Calling Epirus water frogs have been observed at water temperatures between 13 and 24.5 °Celsius.

Mating call
The calls consist of very short pulses with intervals in between, which is why the calls sound creaky. According to the calculated equations, the calls last for 616 milliseconds at a water temperature of 15 °Celsius and consist of 32 pulses. As the temperature rises, the duration of the calls decreases, while the number of pulses per call increases. The frequency spectrum has a strong component between 1400 and 2400 Hertz. The males mostly give the calls in series.

References

Pelophylax
Amphibians of Europe
Amphibians described in 1984
Taxonomy articles created by Polbot